Hylesia is a genus of moths in the family Saturniidae. The genus was erected by Jacob Hübner in 1820.

Species

Hylesia acuta Druce, 1886
Hylesia aeneides (Druce, 1897)
Hylesia alticola Lemaire, 1988
Hylesia anchises Lemaire, 1988
Hylesia andensis Lemaire, 1988
Hylesia andrei Dognin, 1923
Hylesia angulex Draudt, 1929
Hylesia annulata Schaus, 1911
Hylesia ascodex Dyar, 1913
Hylesia athlia Dyar, 1913
Hylesia beneluzi Lemaire, 1988
Hylesia bertrandi Lemaire, 1982
Hylesia biolleya Schaus, 1927
Hylesia bouvereti Dognin, 1889
Hylesia canitia (Cramer, 1780)
Hylesia cedomnibus Dyar, 1913
Hylesia coex Dyar, 1913
Hylesia coinopus Dyar, 1913
Hylesia colimatifex Dyar, 1913
Hylesia colombex Dognin, 1923
Hylesia composita Dognin, 1912
Hylesia continua (Walker, 1865)
Hylesia corevia Schaus, 1900
Hylesia cottica Schaus, 1932
Hylesia cressida Dyar, 1913
Hylesia dalina Schaus, 1911
Hylesia daryae Decaens, Bonilla & Wolfe, 2003
Hylesia discifex Draudt, 1929
Hylesia dyarex Schaus, 1921
Hylesia ebalus (Cramer, 1775)
Hylesia egrex Draudt, 1929
Hylesia extremex Naumann, Brosch & Wenczel, 2005
Hylesia falcifera (Hübner, 1825)
Hylesia fallaciosa Lemaire, 2002
Hylesia frederici Lemaire, 1993
Hylesia frigida Schaus, 1911
Hylesia gamelioides Michener, 1952
Hylesia gigantex Draudt, 1929
Hylesia gyrex C. Brown, 1913
Hylesia hamata Schaus, 1911
Hylesia hawksi Lemaire, Wolfe & Monzon, 2001
Hylesia haxairei Lemaire, 1988
Hylesia hubbelli Lemaire, 1982
Hylesia humilis Dognin, 1923
Hylesia ileana Schaus, 1932
Hylesia index Dyar, 1913
Hylesia indurata Dyar, 1910
Hylesia inficita (Walker, 1865)
Hylesia invidiosa Dyar, 1914
Hylesia iola C. Brown, 1913
Hylesia leilex Dyar, 1913
Hylesia lineata Druce, 1886
Hylesia maurex Draudt, 1929
Hylesia medifex Dognin, 1916
Hylesia melanops Lemaire, 2002
Hylesia melanostigma (Herrich-Schaeffer, 1855)
Hylesia metabus (Cramer, 1775)
Hylesia metapyrrha (Walker, 1855)
Hylesia moronensis Lemaire, 1976
Hylesia mortifex Dyar, 1913
Hylesia munonia Schaus, 1927
Hylesia murex Dyar, 1913
Hylesia mymex Dyar, 1913
Hylesia nanus (Walker, 1855)
Hylesia natex Draudt, 1929
Hylesia nigricans Berg, 1875
Hylesia nigridorsata Dognin, 1912
Hylesia nigripes Draudt, 1929
Hylesia oblonga Lemaire, 2002
Hylesia obtusa Dognin, 1923
Hylesia olivenca Schaus, 1927
Hylesia oratex Dyar, 1913
Hylesia orbifex Dyar, 1913
Hylesia oroyex Dognin, 1922
Hylesia pallidex Dognin, 1923
Hylesia paraguayensis Lemaire, 2002
Hylesia paulex Dognin, 1922
Hylesia pauper Dyar, 1913
Hylesia pearsoni Lemaire, 2002
Hylesia peigleri Lemaire, 2002
Hylesia penai Lemaire, 1988
Hylesia praeda Dognin, 1901
Hylesia pseudomoronensis de Camargo, 2007
Hylesia remex Dyar, 1913
Hylesia rex Dyar, 1913
Hylesia rosacea Schaus, 1911
Hylesia roseata Dognin, 1914
Hylesia rubrifrons Schaus, 1911
Hylesia rufex Draudt, 1929
Hylesia rufipes Schaus, 1911
Hylesia santaelenensis Lemaire, 1988
Hylesia schuessleri Strand, 1934
Hylesia scortina Draudt, 1929
Hylesia subaurea Schaus, 1900
Hylesia subcana (Walker, 1855)
Hylesia subcottica Lemaire, 2002
Hylesia subfasciata Dognin, 1916
Hylesia tapabex Dyar, 1913
Hylesia tapareba Dyar, 1913
Hylesia teratex Draudt, 1929
Hylesia terranea Schaus, 1906
Hylesia terrosex Dognin, 1916
Hylesia thaumex Draudt, 1929
Hylesia tinturex Schaus, 1921
Hylesia tiphys Dognin, 1916
Hylesia travassosi Lemaire, 1988
Hylesia umbrata Schaus, 1911
Hylesia umbratula Dyar, 1915
Hylesia valvex Dyar, 1913
Hylesia vassali Lemaire, 1988
Hylesia venezuelensis Lemaire, 2002
Hylesia vialactea Draudt, 1929
Hylesia vindex Dyar, 1913
Hylesia zonex Draudt, 1929

References

Hemileucinae